Feast of the Blood Monsters is the debut studio album by Dance Club Massacre. It was released on June 6, 2006.

Release and information
The band originally self-produced Feast of the Blood Monsters and released it onto Interpunk on June 6, 2006 but only limited to 1,100 copies. The album reached on Interpunk's list of top 50 best sold items selling all of its copies and they subsequently signed to Black Market Activities who then reissued and remastered the album and released it with new artwork on July 10, 2007.

The album features many popular culture references throughout such as how track 10 is a quote from the film Home Alone, the female screaming audio clip in "Murders Come with Smiles" is from the film The Blair Witch Project and the end of the album features an audio sample from Mortal Kombat II.

Track listing
"Dios Mio! el Diablo es Muy Picante" – 2:05
"Meet Me in the Pub for a Shot of Dignity" – 0:51
"Devon Butler's Dying Wishes" – 1:07
"You Know... You Kind of Look Cute in the Dark" – 4:46
"Wet Between the Thighs" – 1:52
"Murders Come with Smiles" – 5:04
"The Duchess and the Cougar" – 2:14
"Showdown in San Antonio" – 4:19
"You'll Bring the Bitches, I'll Bring the Dynamite" – 1:22
"You're What the French Call 'Les Incompetents'" – 4:37

Personnel
Nick Seger – vocals
Mitch Hein – guitars
Chris Mrozek – bass
Jon Caruso – drums
Matt Hynek – keyboards

References

2006 debut albums
Dance Club Massacre albums
Self-released albums